Miroslav Menc (born 16 March 1971, in Rumburk) is a Czech shot putter, whose personal best put is 20.64 metres, achieved in September 2000 in Ostrava.
He has an indoor personal best of 20.68 metres

In 1998 he received a two-year suspension from the IAAF after testing positive for stanozolol at a meet in Athens. He was disqualified from the 1998 European Indoor Championships. In 2001 he tested positive for norandrosterone, and became the first Czech athlete to receive a life ban.

International competitions

See also
List of sportspeople sanctioned for doping offences

References

External links

1971 births
Living people
People from Rumburk
Czech male shot putters
Czechoslovak male shot putters
Olympic athletes of the Czech Republic
Athletes (track and field) at the 1996 Summer Olympics
Athletes (track and field) at the 2000 Summer Olympics
World Athletics Championships athletes for the Czech Republic
Doping cases in athletics
Czech sportspeople in doping cases
Sportspeople from the Ústí nad Labem Region